George M. Wikoff (born 1968) is a United States Navy rear admiral who currently serves as the vice director of the Joint Staff. He previously served as the Special Assistant to the Deputy Chief of Naval Operations for Operations, Plans and Strategy of the United States Navy.

In January 2023, Wikoff was nominated for promotion to vice admiral and assignment as commander of the United States Naval Forces Central Command, United States Fifth Fleet, and Combined Maritime Forces.

Career highlights
Topgun instructor (Lieutenant) at the Naval Strike and Air Warfare Center (NSAWC), 1998.

On 6 July 1998, Wikoff was pilot of F-14 Tomcat BuNo 160408 for a 1-V-1 training mission at Fallon Range Training Complex. A mis-rigged throttle, when retarded to idle, caused a compressor stall of one engine and the aircraft entered a spin. The crew, Wickoff and RIO Art "Kato" Delacruz, both instructors at NSAWC, successfully ejected.

References

1968 births
Living people
Place of birth missing (living people)
People from New Brunswick, New Jersey
Catholic University of America alumni
United States Naval Aviators
University of Arkansas alumni
United States Navy admirals
Military personnel from New Jersey